High-speed rail in the United Kingdom is provided on five upgraded railway lines running at top speeds of  and one purpose-built high-speed line reaching .

Trains currently travel at 125 mph (200 km/h) on the East Coast Main Line, Great Western Main Line, Midland Main Line, parts of the Cross Country Route, and the West Coast Main Line. On the latter line, only tilting trains can reach this maximum speed due to the difficult track geometry.

The 67-mile long High Speed 1 (HS1) line connects London to the Channel Tunnel, with international Eurostar services running from London St Pancras International to cities in France, Belgium, and the Netherlands at 186 mph (300 km/h). That line is also used by high-speed commuter services from Kent to the capital, operating at top speeds of 140 mph (225 km/h).

Government-backed plans to provide east-west high-speed services between cities in the North of England are also in their early stages of development, as part of the Northern Powerhouse Rail project.

There has been no single national rail operator in the UK since British Rail was privatised in the 1990s. High-speed services are provided by Avanti West Coast, CrossCountry, East Midlands Railway, Eurostar, Grand Central, Great Western Railway, Hull Trains, London North Eastern Railway, Lumo, Southeastern and TransPennine Express.

History

High-speed steam

During the age of steam locomotion, the British railway industry strove to develop reliable technology for powering high-speed rail services between major cities.

The earliest attempt to build a railway line dedicated for operation at the higher speeds was the Great Central Main Line, opened by the Great Central Railway (GCR) in 1899. This line was an ambitious project led by railway entrepreneur Sir Edward Watkin who envisaged a Liverpool-Paris route crossing from Britain to France via a proposed channel tunnel. The line was built to certain specifications so that it could take advantage of the higher speeds offered by the advances in steam locomotion. For most of the line the ruling gradient did not exceed 1 in 176 ( ‰); outside urban areas wide curves were employed with a minimum radius of 1 mile; the route only had one level crossing; and, unlike other railway lines in Britain, the Great Central Main Line was built to an expanded continental loading gauge which meant it could accommodate larger-sized continental trains. The GCR's target market was higher-class 'business' travellers, and it promoted its long-distance express trains with the slogan "Rapid Travel in Luxury". Most of the Great Central Main Line closed in 1966 as part of the Beeching cuts, although parts of the route are still in use today by Chiltern Railways as the London to Aylesbury Line. An alternative proposal to re-open the GCR for freight has been put forward by the Central Railway company.

Various claims exist for the first locomotive to break the  barrier, notably the Great Western Railway's City of Truro (1904) and the LNER's Flying Scotsman (1934). Locomotive power capable of reaching  has existed in Britain since 1938, when the LNER's Mallard broke the steam locomotive speed record.

The APT

In the 1970s, British Rail began to explore new technologies for enabling high-speed passenger rail services in the UK. An experimental version, the APT-E was tested between 1972 and 1976. It was equipped with a tilting mechanism which allowed the train to tilt into bends to reduce cornering forces on passengers, and was powered by gas turbines (the first to be used on British Rail since the Great Western Railway, and subsequent Western Region utilised Swiss built Brown-Boveri, and British built Metropolitan Vickers locomotives (18000 and 18100) in the early 1950s). The 1970s oil crisis prompted a rethink in the choice of motive power (as with the prototype TGV in France), and British Rail later opted for traditional electric overhead lines when the pre-production and production APTs were brought into service in 1980-86.

Initial experience with the Advanced Passenger Trains was good. They had a high power-to-weight ratio to enable rapid acceleration; the prototype set record speeds on the Great Western Main Line and the Midland Main Line, and the production versions vastly reduced journey times on the WCML. The APT was, however, beset with technical problems; financial constraints and negative media coverage eventually caused the project to be cancelled.

InterCity 125

During the same period, British Rail also invested in a separate, parallel project to design a train based on conventional technology as a stopgap. The HST was diesel-powered, and the Great Western Main Line (GWML) was the first to be modified for the new service. The Intercity 125 had proven the economic case for high-speed rail, and British Rail was keen to explore further advances.

InterCity 225

BR then proceeded to electrify the ECML and ordered a new fleet of InterCity 225 electric trains in the mid-1980s. This indicated it was safe to proceed above , but HMRSI eventually ruled that this was dangerous and that speeds above  would require in-cab signalling.

High-speed DMUs

In the early 2000s, a number of train operating companies introduced diesel multiple units (DMUs) capable of  speeds, including the Adelante, Voyager, Super-Voyager and Meridian/Pioneer units.

Pendolino

In 2002, Virgin Trains West Coast introduced a new high-speed service on the West Coast Main Line with a fleet of 53 custom-designed Pendolino trains. The nine-car trains were constructed by Alstom and are equipped with a tilting mechanism developed by Fiat to enable them to run at high speeds on existing rail infrastructure, thus fulfilling the aims of the APT project some 30 years later.

The 2004 West Coast Main Line modernisation programme, which was an upgrade to the infrastructure to allow faster line speeds,
ran over budget, and plans were consequently scaled back. Some members of the fleet were later lengthened to 11 carriages.

High Speed 1 (HS1)

High Speed 1 (HS1) (formally the Channel Tunnel Rail Link (CTRL)) was the first new mainline railway to be built in the UK for a century and was constructed by London and Continental Railways. After a lengthy process of route selection and public enquiries in the second half of the 1990s, work got under way on Section 1 from the Channel Tunnel to west of the Medway in 1998 and the line opened in 2003. Section 2, continuing the line to London St Pancras, started soon after Section 1 and was opened to the public on 14 November 2007.

The HS1 line was finished on time and under budget. The reduction in journey times and increase in reliability achieved through the opening of Section 1 enabled Eurostar to capture 71% of the total London–Paris market and over 80% of the leisure market and Section 2 has increased these figures further. Additionally, the connections provided to the WCML, MML and ECML by Section 2 may see growth of hitherto marginal markets, by finally allowing Regional Eurostars to operate, at least on the electrified ECML and WCML.

Market share statistics of Eurostar on London–Paris (punctuality between brackets):

 September 2006 (July–September 91.4%)
 August 2005 71.03% (January–September 87%)
 May 2005 69%
 August 2004 67.87% (January–December 84%)
 July 2004 65.88% (January–June 89%)
 October 2003 65%
 July 2003 60.23% (January–June 77%)

The completion and successful operation of HS1 Sections 1 and 2 spurred much discussion and several proposals for new lines in the UK and many interested parties are hoping to capitalise on the momentum given to these ideas by the completion of the complete HS1. These proposals are discussed below.

Southeastern High-Speed is currently the only British domestic high-speed service allowed to run above .

High Speed 2 (HS2) 

High Speed 2 (HS2) is a high-speed railway originally designed to serve London, Birmingham, Sheffield and Leeds, or alternatively London, Manchester, Liverpool, Preston, Glasgow and Edinburgh and Sheffield. The UK Government launched a formal high-speed rail project in January 2009, and high-speed rail has the support of all three main political parties. Subject to consultation, the London terminus for the high-speed line would be Euston, a new Birmingham city-centre station would be built at Curzon Street, and there would be interchange stations with the Elizabeth line at Old Oak Common and with the existing intercity rail network near Birmingham Airport.

HS2's original proposal was for a Y-shaped network between London and England's major regional cities, serving Manchester, Birmingham, Leeds, East Midlands and Newcastle, with connections on to the West Coast and East Coast main lines to allow through services to Scotland. The Greengauge 21 study states that the total route length, including the connections to the existing network and High Speed One, would be .

The first phase of High Speed 2 is currently under construction. However, the Integrated Rail Plan for the North and Midlands (IRP) was published on 18 November 2021 and impacted the High Speed 2 plan.

Studies and proposals
In 2001, two privately sponsored proposals were put forward to build high-speed lines in the UK. The first, from Virgin Rail Group, was part of its tender for the InterCity East Coast franchise. The second, from FirstGroup, was independent of the Department for Transport / Strategic Rail Authority rail franchising process. Neither was welcomed by the government, which in the wake of the Hatfield rail crash was focused on - as it saw it - getting the rail network back to reliable operations.

Virgin Trains' ECML bid

When the InterCity East Coast franchise (then operated by GNER) came up for its first renewal, Virgin Rail Group raised the idea in 2000 of constructing new track and purchasing a new fleet of trains for the line. The new track would be from Peterborough to Yorkshire and on from Newcastle to the Scottish border. This first line would have opened in 2009 and was chosen for ease of construction in the south and elimination of severe curves in Northumberland. Later, if successful, further stretches would have been upgraded. Publicity material featuring Virgin branded TGV and ICE trains appeared, and it was stated that the stock would be built in Birmingham. Virgin's bid was rejected, and GNER's franchise was renewed.

FirstGroup's plans for the GWML corridor
Around the same time, First Great Western, operator of lines west of London, announced a study into a  line from London to South West England and South Wales. First sponsored the study and input was given by other stakeholders in the regions to be served.

Journey times from London given included:
Swindon 35 mins
Bristol Parkway 49 mins
Cardiff Central 70 mins
Swansea 120 mins
Plymouth 140 mins

Although First stated that this report would be published and given to the SRA and government, little has been heard of the plan since the initial press release. In 2010 Cardiff city council again lobbied central government for a high-speed rail line to London via Bristol, then estimated to contribute £2.2 billion to the Welsh economy. The Department for Transport responded to this bid by stating that "the Government's vision is of a truly national high-speed rail network for the whole of Britain. However, given financial constraints, we will have to achieve this in phases. Ministers are currently considering HS2 Ltd's proposals in respect of the potential first phase of such a network. We are aware of the proposals for a high speed line to Wales and these will feed into our thinking as we seek to develop a wider high speed rail network."

Government-commissioned studies

Since the completion of Section 1 of the HS1, government departments and ministers have commissioned reports into the viability of high-speed rail. This is in part due to the success of the HS1 project, part due to realisation that upgrades to existing infrastructure offer poor value for money and cannot hope to meet future capacity needs, and part due to increasing environmental concerns over the expansion of the short-haul airline industry.

Atkins study
In 2001, the SRA commissioned Atkins to perform a feasibility study into the transport and business case for high-speed rail. The study, published on 29 October 2004, looked at combinations of 11 routing options to accommodate forecast traffic flows and concluded:
New capacity is required to relieve the WCML by 2015
Further new capacity will be required to relieve all three north-south routes by 2031
Construction of the complete proposed network would cost £33bn, the shortest option £10bn
The line would give a cost-benefit ratio of between 1.9 and 2.8 to 1

Furthermore, additional work was done to look at the impact of road pricing, downgrading the enhancements to the ECML, and changes to the Treasury's green book method of assessing project finance. All three areas were found to improve the case for high-speed rail.
Atkins Option 1
The Atkins study proposed a line between London and Stoke-on-Trent, broadly following the existing WCML and using the WCML for onward connection, as its baseline scenario.

Atkins Option 8
The study concluded that new lines should be built each side of the Pennines, with the eastern line continuing to Edinburgh and Glasgow. A branch also serves Heathrow Airport. This is the £33bn "end game" scenario.

Atkins Option 10
The study considered a link between Manchester and Leeds but did not take this forward.

Commission for Integrated Transport

In 2004 the Commission for Integrated Transport commissioned Steer Davies Gleave to produce a report on high-speed rail. The report focused on the reasons why the costs being quoted for British HSR routes (particularly in Atkins) were high in comparison to other countries, in addition to investigating the business case and transport case for such a network.

The routes studied gave hypothetical journey times from and to London as follows:

The study gave the following recommendations:
That the Government and SRA begin to plan now for High-Speed Rail (HSR) as part of a wider strategy to ease the anticipated capacity constraints on the existing networks. Schemes that appeared to offer good value for money should be actively progressed.
That costs of HSR projects be closely examined to bring them closer to the lower costs achieved in Europe. They should take account of possible reductions in underlying costs and further cost reductions if the industry structure, safety regulations and the approvals process were reviewed.
That the Government examine ways of maximising private sector involvement in HSR. This should take account of the potential impact of any future national road charging scheme on passenger demand and its potential to make private sector investment more attractive.
That changes in the appraisal process be considered relating to value of time, economic impact analysis, environmental assessments and risk/optimism bias allowances.
Additional capacity would be required by 2015.
Ways to reduce the currently high cost of new rail infrastructure such as high-speed lines included:
Building lines in phases rather than all at once could produce a cost saving of 20%-30%.
British project management, planning, design and legal costs can reach 25% of the total cost (compared with 3% on the Spanish Madrid–Lerida line) and could therefore be reduced.
If these cost savings materialised, then the benefits could outweigh the costs by 3 to 1.

Eddington report

In 2006 British Airways' former chief executive Sir Rod Eddington produced a report on future transport strategy.

The report covered all transport modes and had initially been expected to strongly recommend investment in high-speed rail. However, on 29 August 2006 The Times reported that Sir Rod would state that given a limited transport budget, a high-speed rail link is not the most cost-effective option to obtain higher capacity on the rail network and therefore should not be built. Most of the press continued to take this line when the report was finally published, drawing scorn from both opposition parties, Labour back-benchers and transport pressure groups alike. The report seemed to confirm this:

However, Sir Rod later claimed both to the press and to a parliamentary select committee that he was quoted out of context in reports at the time, had aimed his comments specifically at speculative MagLev options, and in fact was in favour of using conventional high-speed rail to relieve congestion once existing main lines reached capacity. Indeed the quotation refers specifically to very high speed lines. Nevertheless, enthusiasm for such projects seemed to wane after the report's publication, at least in Westminster. The topic remained much on the political agenda in the North East of England and Scotland.

Greengauge 21 study

In June 2007, the campaign group Greengauge 21 published a proposal for High Speed Two. It evaluated options for high-speed rail in the UK and recommended an £11bn route from London St Pancras and Heathrow to Birmingham and the North West, which they dubbed HS2. The report recommended the new line be built in the M40/Chiltern Main Line corridor, and used it as the basis for its findings. This route has the greatest strategic advantage, as the Chiltern Main Line is a popular alternative to the WCML from Birmingham to London, and also lends the opportunity to build a branch line to Heathrow Airport, giving the passengers served by the WCML a direct service to one of the world's premier international airports. The WCML is also the corridor which would be under the most pressure in the next 15 – 20 years. A connection to High Speed 1 would allow Eurostar terminals to open in Birmingham and Manchester.

Branching off HS1, it would briefly follow the WCML and GWML, branching off at the connection with the Central line, going to Northolt Junction, where it will follow the Chiltern Main Line and have a triangular junction serving a branch to Heathrow. The line will be tunnelled at Chiltern stations, up till Princes Risborough, where it will incorporate itself with the intercity line, up to Banbury, where it will branch off and hug the M40 and M42, before joining the Birmingham Loop, at Birmingham International/NEC. Links to Milton Keynes and Oxford via the Varsity Line, and Banbury in the middle of the Line, would experience a growth in services. Local services on Chiltern, WCML south of Rugby, and Banbury–Coventry–Birmingham could be intensified.

The new line would enable journey times of:
 London to Birmingham in 45 minutes
 Birmingham to Paris in 3 hours
 London to Manchester (via the WCML after the Trent Valley) in 1 hour 30 minutes
 Manchester to Paris in 3 hours 45 minutes
The line would be built to the continental loading gauge, allowing the use of double-decker trains.

On 3 July 2007 reports appeared in several British newspapers about the UK government's forthcoming 30-year strategy (see below) It was stated that "Britain may need High Speed 2", but that "the strategy will stop short of promising to pay for the line".

In September 2009, Greengauge 21 published a new study into High Speed Rail. Greengauge's plan calls for two north/south corridors from London, which would broadly parallel the ECML and WCML, together with three east/west corridors between London-Bristol, Sheffield-Manchester and Edinburgh-Glasgow. Both the north/south lines would consist of new-built high-speed lines, while the east/west corridors would run on existing lines upgraded to allow  running. One of the central parts of the Greengauge 21 proposal is to have it linked directly with High Speed 1, to allow through running to the Channel Tunnel, thus enabling trains to run direct from regional cities to Europe. The draft timetable produced as part of the plan estimates that trains could run between Birmingham and Paris in approximately 3 hours.
High-Speed North-East - the North-East route would run north from London to Cambridge, with a spur connecting to Stansted Airport and beyond into East Anglia joining up with Great Eastern Main Line at Ipswich and diverting from Stansted towards the East Midlands, stopping at Nottingham and Sheffield. It would then run as far as Leeds, before resuming the route of the ECML towards Newcastle. Between Newcastle and Edinburgh, the route would consist of existing upgraded line rather than new build.
High-Speed North-West - the North-West route would be completely new build. This would run north towards Birmingham, with a spur to Heathrow Airport, before reaching Manchester and Liverpool. Both of these would be on branches off the main line, with Manchester at a triangular junction; the main line would continue north where it would fork, with branches to Glasgow and Edinburgh, where it would connect with the North-East Line.
A triangular junction at Heathrow would allow access from these western destinations to the North-West route without the need to go via London.
High-Speed Trans-Pennine - the Trans-Pennine route would be a short corridor of upgraded line connecting Sheffield and Manchester. Both of these would be on triangular junctions, allowing access to all destinations on the North-East and North-West corridors.
High-Speed Scotland - the Scottish route would be a corridor between Edinburgh and Glasgow, consisting of entirely new-build line.

Government White Paper: Delivering a Sustainable Railway
In July 2007, the new Transport Secretary, Ruth Kelly, delivered a white paper on the future of the railways. The report outlined the government's strategic plan for the railways until 2037 which recommended "further study" and stated that dedicated magnetic levitation system and freight lines were "too expensive". Amongst the support documentation for the white paper was a report by transport professors Roderick Smith and Roger Kemp which reviewed the options for a MagLev trunk line, particularly those proposed by UK Ultraspeed, and concluded that it was a high-risk option, with a high impact on transport energy use and therefore carbon dioxide emissions.

Second Atkins study
In March 2008, The Observer and The Sunday Times both reported that a second report for the Department of Transport by Atkins entitled Because Transport Matters showed that the original Option 8 (a high-speed network on both west and east coasts) would give a benefit of £63bn, well in excess of the predicted costs of £31bn. The report suggested building two  lines on the East and West coasts. The West coast line would run to Manchester, and the East coast line would run to Edinburgh and Glasgow. Travel times of 71 minutes to Manchester and 74 minutes to Sheffield were mentioned in the report.

Network Rail study

In August 2009, Network Rail published a study outlining its proposals for the expansion of the railway network. The headline proposal was its plan for a new high-speed rail line between London and Glasgow/Edinburgh, following a route through the West Midlands and the North-West of England. This plan, whereby the new line would follow a similar but not totally parallel route to the West Coast Main Line, would involve trains running from both London and Birmingham as southern termini to Manchester, Liverpool, Glasgow and Edinburgh. Included in the report are draft timings which put Birmingham less than an hour from London, Manchester just over an hour, Liverpool just under 90 minutes, and just over two hours to Glasgow and Edinburgh, with sixteen trains per hour estimated from London, and four trains per hour between the regional cities. The report also looked into the question of services to Heathrow Airport, and came to the conclusion that running all trains from London via Heathrow reduced the benefit of the line by as much as £3 billion. Instead, Network Rail's proposal would entail a short spur from the main line terminating at Heathrow, reducing the road and air traffic to the airport from the cities that the line would serve. Network Rail also outlined the case for not including such areas as Leeds and the North-East of England in the proposal, with two main points:
The journey time from London to Leeds via Manchester would not be reduced significantly enough over the existing route via the East Coast Main Line to warrant the cost of building the connection.
Leeds would be the top target market for any proposed high-speed line from London to North-East of England, so building a connection to Leeds would reduce the strength of the case for that.

Beyond HS2 Report

In May 2018, Greengauge 21 released a report entitled 'Beyond HS2' which looked at how the rail network could develop by 2050. It proposed several projects:
 New High Speed Line from Colchester and Cambridge (via Stansted) to Stratford (possibly extending to Canary Wharf)
 A New Higher Speed Line from Perth and Dundee to the Shotts Line
 A new High Speed Line avoiding Motherwell
 A new connection between the HS2 Eastern Leg and Kingsbury allowing services to continue to Bristol, Cardiff and Plymouth via Cheltenham Spa.
 A new link between WCML and Crossrail
 A new link between Langley and Heathrow
 A new link between Richmond and Waterloo to Heathrow T2
 A new link between Heathrow and Staines
 A new Northern Powerhouse Rail
 A new line between Darlington and Newcastle

Northern Powerhouse Rail (HS3)

In June 2014, the then Chancellor of the Exchequer, George Osborne proposed a high speed rail link High Speed 3 (HS3) between Liverpool and Newcastle/Sheffield/Hull. The line would utilise the existing route between Liverpool and Newcastle/Hull, and a new route from to Sheffield will follow the same route to Manchester Victoria, and then a new line from Victoria to Sheffield, with additional tunnels and other infrastructure.

Osborne suggested the line should be considered as part of a review of the second phase of High Speed 2. Initial estimates suggested a rail line with a  line speed, and Leeds-Manchester journey times reduced to 30 minutes, Osborne estimated the cost to be less per mile than that of HS2, giving a cost of under £6 billion. Initial responses to the proposal were mixed: Jeremy Acklam of the Institution of Engineering and Technology (IET) suggested that plans should look at connecting other northern cities; such as Liverpool, and potentially north-east England via York; commentators noted that the proposal could be viewed as an attempt to gain political support in the north of England in the run-up to the 2015 general election: The Institute of Economic Affairs (IEA) characterised the proposal as a "headline grabbing vanity project designed to attract votes". However the British Chambers of Commerce (BCC), Confederation of British Industry (CBI), and others were cautiously positive about the proposal, but emphasised the need to deliver on existing smaller-scale schemes.

Heathrow Airport to Gatwick Airport - High Speed 4Air 
In 2011, the Department for Transport confirmed that ministers were studying a proposal for a  line between London Heathrow and Gatwick Airports. The journey would take 15 minutes and provide the first direct rail link between the two airports. The plan could virtually make Heathrow and Gatwick into a single hub. In 2018 a proposal was put forward by a British engineering consultancy, Expedition Engineering, for HS4Air, a high-speed railway line that would run to the south of Greater London, creating a  link between HS2 and HS1 via Heathrow and Gatwick Airports.

High speed trains

Before the year 2000, there had been three types of high speed trains in Britain:
 Advanced Passenger Train (APT) - Tilting trains which never entered into regular revenue-earning service.
 InterCity 125, also called HST (High Speed Train) - diesel trains consisting of two Class 43 power cars with a rake of Mark 3 coaches between.
 InterCity 225 - electric trains consisting of a Class 91 locomotive and a rake of Mark 4 coaches and Driving Van Trailer.

Since 2000,  trains that could be classed as high speed (≤200 km/h) trains include:
 Class 180 Adelante
 Class 220 Voyager
 Class 221 Super Voyager
 Class 222 Meridians and Pioneers
 Class 390 Pendolino
 Class 397 Nova 2
 The Hitachi Super Express
- Class 800
- Class 801
- Class 802

A lot of money and resources were put into fundamental research into vehicle dynamics which, among other advances, led to the development of the APT. The APT achieved high speeds around curves by tilting. Although the prototype was deemed successful and production units were built, they never entered regular service.

By this time, development was underway of another train design which became the InterCity 125.

The InterCity 125 was planned as a stop-gap. Research had begun for the tilting APT but it was uncertain when it could enter service. The HST applied what had been learned so far to traditional technology - a project parallel to the APT but based on conventional principles while incorporating the newly discovered knowledge of wheel/rail interaction and suspension design. The APT never achieved all its design objectives but the InterCity 125 was a success.

The InterCity 125 was introduced by British Rail between 1976 and 1982, when the maximum speed had previously been 100 mph (160 km/h). The increased top speed and its acceleration and deceleration allowed for shortened journey times. The prototype class 252 (power cars 43000 and 43001) took the world record for diesel traction, achieving 143.2 mph (230 km/h) on 12 June 1973 on the East Coast Main Line between Northallerton and Thirsk. On 1 November 1987 the record was raised to 148.4 mph (238 km/h) by a shortened class 254 set running speed trials between Darlington and York. On 27 September 1985 a shortened class 254 set carrying passengers ran non-stop from Newcastle to London King's Cross, averaging 115.4 mph. HSTs were originally identified as Class 253 (seven trailer cars) used on the GWML and Class 254 (eight trailer cars) used on the ECML.

The InterCity 125 is used on numerous intercity services today while the tilting trains it was supposed to complement and ultimately be replaced by only began to appear on British railways in the early 2000s.

However, the aim for the Advanced Passenger Train was to achieve 155 mph (250 km/h) running. Although this was achieved during trials, it was not possible in normal service in the UK due to the shortness of British signal spacing, apart from the dedicated CTRL.

The earliest replacement of InterCity 125s started with the introduction of the InterCity 225, between 1988 and 1991 in conjunction with electrification of the East Coast Main Line.

More recently, some InterCity 125s have been replaced or supplemented by:
 Class 180 Adelante - built 2000-2001 for Great Western Railway, also operated by Grand Central and Hull Trains.
 Class 220 Voyager - built 2000-2001 for Virgin CrossCountry, now operated by CrossCountry.
 Class 221 Super Voyager - built 2001-2002 for Virgin CrossCountry, also operated by CrossCountry.
 Class 222 Meridian - built 2002-2004 for Midland Mainline, now operated by East Midlands Railway.

Future trains
After units such as the Intercity 125 were retired, GWR replaced them with Class 800 and Class 802 Hitachi units. LNER replaced their units with Class 800 and Class 802 units. East Midlands Railway replaced theirs with Class 180 units, as an interim solution until Class 810 units are built.

Avanti West Coast are replacing their Class 220 and Class 221 Bombardier Voyagers with new Hitachi Class 805 and Class 807 units.

TransPennine Express decided to move from operating commuter trains to high speed trains, with Class 802 and Class 397 units coming in. These units allowed TransPennine to begin services up the East Coast Main Line to Edinburgh from Manchester Piccadilly.

Lumo is a new operator that will commence in October 2021. It will operate Class 803s built by Hitachi up the East Coast Main Line from London Kings Cross to Edinburgh Waverley. 

High Speed 2 will have some new trains. The bidding process included Alstom, CAF, Hitachi, Siemens and Talgo. In December 2021, the contract for HS2 rolling stock was awarded to a joint venture between Hitachi Rail and Alstom, for a development of the Zefiro 300.

Intercity Express Programme (IEP)

On 8 March 2007, the Department for Transport invited bidders to participate in the Intercity Express Programme or IEP. This is a project to replace the ageing InterCity 125 and subsequently InterCity 225 fleets with a new high-speed train designed to operate on the ECML, GWML and Cross Country routes. The project grew out of discussions between FirstGroup and Siemens in the early years of the decade, later being taken over by the SRA and DfT.

On 12 February 2009, the DfT announced that Agility Trains, a consortium led by Hitachi, was the preferred bidder, with a train named the Hitachi Super Express. In February 2010 it was announced the programme was suspended pending an independent report, with a decision on its viability to be given after the 2010 General Election.

Overview of rolling stock 
The following table lists the rolling stock operating or having operated in Great Britain that is capable of a top speed of 125 mph or greater:

HSR promoters
The recent interest in high-speed rail generated by the success of the CTRL has led to the formation of several companies and non-profit groups aiming to further the construction of domestic high-speed lines in Britain. The principal groups are:

Greengauge 21
Greengauge 21 is a non-profit group aiming to establish conventional high-speed wheel-on-rail technology as the mode of choice for new lines. The group has performed studies on routeing, environmental issues and the use of high-speed rail as an alternative to short-haul airlines.

Currently it is proposing a new high-speed line between, at first, London and Birmingham. This is tentatively called High Speed Two.

Eleven cities campaign
Eleven big cities announced a joint campaign for a high-speed rail network serving the entire of Great Britain on 9 September 2009. Birmingham, Bristol, Cardiff, Edinburgh, Glasgow, Leeds, Liverpool, Manchester, Newcastle, Nottingham and Sheffield stated as their goal that The campaign will be deliberately focused on the importance of building a whole network to link all our major economic centres together, not simply a sterile debate about where a first route should go.

High Speed UK

Two railway engineers have proposed an alternative network to HS2, which they claim would provide higher connectivity and 25% lower cost than HS2.

Other developments

Liberal Democrats plans for British high-speed rail network
On 2 August 2007, the BBC reported that the Liberal Democrats proposed the building of a high-speed rail network in Great Britain, connecting London with Birmingham, Leeds, Manchester, Tyneside and Scotland in the north and Bristol, Cardiff and Exeter in the west. Funding for the investment would come from an extra £10 tax per ticket on internal flights in Britain and tolls on road freight, mirroring similar toll schemes in Germany, Austria, Switzerland and the Czech Republic.

On 22 August 2007, a Scottish Liberal Democrat MSP tabled a motion to the Scottish Parliament calling for a high-speed rail link between Edinburgh, Glasgow and London.

Conservatives plans to force short-haul passengers on to high-speed rail
On 28 August 2007, The Times reported that the Conservative Party has found that 20% of all flights from Heathrow are to destinations that can be - or soon will be able to be - reached in a competitive time by high-speed rail (the top ten short haul destinations are: Paris, Amsterdam, Edinburgh, Manchester, Brussels, Glasgow, Newcastle, Leeds/Bradford, Rotterdam and Durham/Tees Valley). They plan to impose a moratorium on airport expansion and force this traffic on to the railways, freeing up slots for long-haul flights and removing the need for a third runway at Heathrow and a second runway at Stansted.

Arup publishes plan for HS2
On 2 December 2007, The Sunday Times reported that engineering group Arup, a member of the consortium behind High Speed One, was to put forward a plan for a second British high-speed line to the North of England and Lowland Scotland via Heathrow Airport. This would enable direct transfers between flights and trains to Continental Europe and British regions. The plan, closely resembling that of Greengauge21, was to be formally announced later in week commencing 3 December 2007.

Accidents and incidents
Southall rail crash — on 19 September 1997, a Great Western Trains InterCity 125 operating a service from Swansea to London Paddington failed to stop at a red signal and collided with a freight train entering Southall goods yard. Seven people were killed and 139 were injured. The train driver, Larry Harrison, was charged with manslaughter (he had been distracted as he had bent down to pack his bag), but the case was dropped. Great Western Trains was fined £1.5 million for violations of health and safety law in connection with the accident.

See also

Channel Tunnel
Department for Transport
High Speed 2
Integrated Rail Plan for the North and Midlands
Rail transport in Great Britain
Rail transport in the United Kingdom

References

 
Proposed railway lines in Scotland
Rail infrastructure in the United Kingdom